Tororo General Hospital, also Tororo Government Hospital, Tororo District Hospital or Tororo Main Hospital, is a hospital in Uganda.

Location
The coordinates of the hospital are: 0°41'39.0"N, 34°11'13.0"E (Latitude:0.694167; Longitude:34.186944).

Overview
Tororo General Hospital is a public hospital owned by the Uganda Government and administered by the Uganda Ministry of Health. The hospital serves the general public despite severe challenges, including poor funding, corruption, inadequate staffing, poor remuneration, insufficient medication and antiquated medical equipment.

A study carried out in 2019, using data collected in 2014, that was published in 2020, identified seven conditions associated with still births (after the 24th week of pregnancy) and neonatal deaths (from age zero to 28 days). The top seven conditions at Tororo General Hospital are: 1. Prematurity of the baby 2. Breech presentation 3. Multiple gestation 4. Cesarean delivery 5. Low birth weight 6. Antepartum hemorrhage and 7.Cord prolapse. The rate of perinatal death at this hospital was higher than Uganda's national targets. The "calculated stillbirth rate was 26.3 per 1000 total deliveries, and the neonatal death rate of 8.9 per 1000 live deliveries".

See also
 List of hospitals in Uganda

References

External links
Website of Uganda Ministry of Health

Hospitals in Uganda
Tororo District
Eastern Region, Uganda